The Doina gas field is a natural gas field located on the continental shelf of the Black Sea. It was discovered in 1990 and developed by Petrom. It began production in 1995 and produces natural gas and condensates. The total proven reserves of the Doina gas field are around 200 billion cubic feet (5.7 km³), and production is slated to be around 17.7 million cubic feet/day (0.5×105m³) in 2008.

References

Black Sea energy

Natural gas fields in Romania